Murata (written: 村田 lit. "village rice paddy") may refer to:

Murata (surname)

People 

 Ryōta Murata, Japanese professional boxer

Technology
Murata Manufacturing, a manufacturer of electronic components and technology
Murata Machinery, also known as Muratec, a manufacturer of industrial and fax machines 
Murata rifle, a Japanese military black-powder rifle of the 19th century.

Places
Murata, Miyagi, a town located in Shibata District, Miyagi, Japan 
Murata (San Marino), a Sanmarinese village
S.S. Murata, a Sanmarinese football club